Toni Schmader is a Professor and Canada Research Chair in social psychology at the University of British Columbia.

Education
Schmader earned a PhD in social psychology in 1999 from the University of California, Santa Barbara. Previously she earned a Bachelor of Arts degree summa cum laude Washington and Jefferson College.

Career 
Schmader was named a Canada Research Chair in social psychology in 2010, receiving funding to "research the interplay between negative stereotypes, self-esteem, emotion, motivation and performance." Among her findings were that "women inhibit their own performance", getting higher scores on tests done under a fictitious name; and that girls are more likely to grow up believing that they can work outside the home if their fathers perform traditionally female domestic chores inside the home.

Publications
K Block, WM Hall, T Schmader, M Inness, E Croft. Social Psychology, 2018. 'Should I Stay or Should I Go?' 
JP Jamieson, WB Mendes, E Blackstock, T Schmader. Journal of Experimental Social Psychology, 2010. 'Turning the knots in your stomach into bows: Reappraising arousal improves performance on the GRE.' 
M Johns, M Inzlicht, T Schmader. Journal of Experimental Psychology: General, 2008. 'Stereotype threat and executive resource depletion: Examining the influence of emotion regulation.' 
T Schmader, M Johns. Journal of personality and social psychology, 2003. 'Converging evidence that stereotype threat reduces working memory capacity.'

References 

Canadian women psychologists
Living people
Social psychologists
Canadian psychologists
Academic staff of the University of British Columbia
University of California, Santa Barbara alumni
Washington & Jefferson College alumni
Canada Research Chairs
Year of birth missing (living people)
Place of birth missing (living people)